Augustinus Antonius Maria "Stijn" Jaspers (23 June 1961 – 18 October 1984) was a Dutch track and field athlete. He competed in the 5000 m event at the 1984 Summer Olympics, but failed to reach the final. In 1983 he won national titles in the 1500 m and 5000 m events.

After completing military service with the Dutch Navy in Driehuis, in 1982 he went to study at Clemson University, South Carolina, United States. He died in his sleep in his room at Clemson, of a rare heart deficiency, which doctors have not detected in him previously.

His younger brother Paul Jaspers is a retired sprint and middle-distance runner.

References

1961 births
1984 deaths
Athletes (track and field) at the 1984 Summer Olympics
Dutch male long-distance runners
Dutch male middle-distance runners
Olympic athletes of the Netherlands
Clemson Tigers men's track and field athletes
People from Raalte
Sportspeople from Overijssel